Lewis Boyce (born 30 July 1996) is an English professional rugby union player, who plays as a loose-head prop for Premiership Rugby club Bath.

Club career
Boyce made his debut for Yorkshire Carnegie against Rotherham in 2014 and made 22 appearances in the RFU Championship. Boyce was part of the side that were defeated by London Irish in the 2017 Championship play-off Final.

On 14 March 2017 it was announced that Boyce would be joining Harlequins for the 2017–18 Aviva Premiership season. On 18 January 2019, Boyce signed for Premiership rivals Bath from the 2019-20 season.

International career
In June 2016, Boyce started for the England U20 side that defeated Ireland in the final of the Junior World Cup. In January 2018 he was named in England's squad for the 2018 Six Nations Championship opener, against Italy.

References

External links
Bath Rugby Profile

1996 births
Living people
Bath Rugby players
English rugby union players
Harlequin F.C. players
Leeds Tykes players
People educated at Prince Henry's Grammar School, Otley
Rugby union players from Middlesbrough
Rugby union props